Plesk is a commercial web hosting and server data center automation software developed for Linux and Windows-based retail hosting service providers. 
 
It was developed by Plesk International GmbH, a company with headquarters in Toronto, Canada, and Schaffhausen, Switzerland, and offices in Barcelona, Spain, Cologne, Germany, Tokyo, Japan, and in the Siberian city of Novosibirsk, Russia, where it was originally created in 2000 by Dimitri Simonenko. 
 
The hosting automation software was initially released by Plesk Inc. and first went live in 2001. In 2003, Plesk was sold to SWSoft, which became Parallels in 2008. In March 2015, Parallels renamed the service provider division to Odin. In December of the same year, Plesk became a separate business entity. In 2017, Plesk was acquired by British Oakley Capital Limited and has since been a part of WebPros, a global SaaS platform for server management. Currently, WebPros comprises Plesk, cPanel, WHMCS, XOVI, and SolusVM.

Licenses 
Plesk, with latest version Obsidian 18.x, is available in the following license configurations:

 Plesk Web Admin Edition: Up to 10 domains. For basic management of simple websites, without the extended tools and features.
 Plesk Web Pro Edition: To manage up to 30 domains. It also includes Plesk WordPress Toolkit full-featured. 
 Plesk Web Host Edition: Unlimited domains. The administrator can also create additional reseller accounts.

The license price also distinguishes whether a license can be used for a dedicated server or a virtualized server. Licenses for dedicated servers are usually slightly more expensive.

Pricing 
Plesk sells all three licenses for a monthly or annual price directly. All three editions can also be obtained from official license resellers.

In March 2018, Plesk announced end-of-life versions price increase, becoming its first price adjustment in 18 years of business. The company raised the prices of all Plesk licenses that had versions earlier than 12, alleging it was to cover the increasing cost of support and management over the past two decades. Following the announcement, Plesk created a FAQ page to clarify any questions about the new pricing adjustment.

Support 
Live and email support for Plesk is available in English, Russian, Spanish, German, Portuguese, and Japanese. Plesk licenses purchased directly from Plesk include full free support.

Criticisms 
The recommended method of removing Plesk is a complete reinstall of OS after backing up, which complicates the concept of trialware by binding an administrator to the product by facing considerable downtime of a server.

Version history

Timeline

Plesk University 

In January 2016, Plesk launched Plesk University online. Through its University, Plesk provides a full range of courses to help users learn how to use their products and services. All courses and exams in their catalog are certified, and access to all of them is free.

See also 
 Web hosting control panel
 Comparison of web hosting control panels

References 

2000 software
Java enterprise platform
Web applications
Website management
User interfaces
Web hosting
Web server management software
Drupal
WordPress